Uğur Demirkol (born 16 January 1990) is a Turkish professional footballer. He plays as a left fullback.

References

External links
 

1990 births
Living people
Footballers from Berlin
Turkish footballers
Association football fullbacks
Ankaraspor footballers
MKE Ankaragücü footballers
SV Waldhof Mannheim players
Kayseri Erciyesspor footballers
Süper Lig players
Turkish expatriate footballers
Expatriate footballers in Germany
Turkey youth international footballers
TFF First League players
Association football defenders